Intratec was a firearm company based in Miami, Florida. The company's most famous product was the TEC-9.

History 

Intratec began as Interdynamic USA, an offshoot of Swedish firearms manufacturer Interdynamic AB. As a result of the lack of a competitive firearms market in Sweden, Interdynamic AB set up a subsidiary in the United States to sell the KG-9. Called Interdynamic USA, this company eventually became Intratec when George Kellgren left the company and Carlos Garcia renamed it Intratec, and continued to sell variants of KG-99, later known as the model it would be known for, the Tec-9.  The company went out of business in 2001.

Products 
Intratec was known for numerous handgun designs using polymer frames and steel stampings.

CAT series 
Designed by famed Israeli gun designer Nehemiah Sirkis, the CAT-9, CAT-380, CAT-40, and CAT-45 pistols are polymer-framed semi-automatic handguns chambered in 9mm Parabellum, .380 Auto, .40 S&W, and .45 ACP, respectively. The design is a derivative of Sirkis' original all-steel Sardius SD-9 pistol.

Protec series 
The Protec-22 and Protec-25 are small semi-automatic handguns chambered in .22 Long Rifle and .25 ACP, respectively.  The Protec-25 is a CZ 45 clone.

TEC-9 

The TEC-9 is the third version of this gun, made and marketed by one of the original principal partners that produced this style of 9mm pistol, first as the open-bolt semi-automatic KG-9 and then as the closed-bolt semi-automatic KG-99.  The TEC-9 name was applied when the Kellgren and Garcia partnership ended and Carlos Garcia went solo as Intratec of Miami, FL.

TEC-22 

The TEC-22 is a handgun chambered in .22 Long Rifle. It uses Ruger 10/22 magazines.

TEC-38 

The TEC-38 is a polymer-framed two-shot derringer chambered in .38 Special.  The Tec-38 was also made in .22 WMR, .32 H&R Magnum, and .357 Magnum.

See also 
 Kel-Tec
 Grendel Inc.

References 

Defunct firearms manufacturers
Firearm manufacturers of the United States
Companies based in Miami
2001 disestablishments in the United States
Manufacturing companies disestablished in 2001
Defunct manufacturing companies based in Florida